Forced suicide is a method of execution where the victim is coerced into committing suicide to avoid facing an alternative option they perceive as much worse, such as suffering torture, public humiliation, or having friends or family members imprisoned, tortured or killed.

In ancient Greece and Rome 

Forced suicide was a common means of execution in ancient Greece and Rome. As a mark of respect it was generally reserved for aristocrats sentenced to death; the victims would either drink hemlock or fall on their swords. Economic motivations prompted some suicides in ancient Rome. A person who was condemned to death would forfeit property to the government. People could evade that provision and let the property pass to their heirs by committing suicide prior to arrest.

The most well-known forced suicide is that of the philosopher Socrates, who drank hemlock after his trial for allegedly corrupting the youth of Athens. The Stoic philosopher Seneca also killed himself in response to an order by his pupil, the Roman Emperor Nero, who himself was forced to commit suicide at a later date. Other famous forced suicides include those of Brutus, Mark Antony, Emperor Otho, and the Roman generals Varus and Corbulo.

In Asia 

The Hindu practice of sati, in which a recently widowed woman would immolate herself on her husband's funeral pyre, is not generally considered a type of honor killing. However, the extent up to which Sati was a purely voluntary act or one that was coerced is actively debated. There have been some incidents in recent times, such as the Roop Kanwar case, in which forced sati was suspected. Additional cases are under investigation, though no evidence of forced suicide has yet been found.

Japanese seppuku falls into this category. The culture practiced by the samurai expected them to ritually kill themselves if found disloyal, sparing a daimyō or shōgun the indignity of executing a follower. This was especially the case in the Edo period, and Asano Naganori was a clear example.

In Europe 
Erwin Rommel, a German military leader during World War II, was implicated in a plot to assassinate Adolf Hitler in 1944.  On Hitler's orders, two generals went to Rommel's home and offered him a choice of either going through a public trial (which would inevitably lead to his execution and the punishment of his family) or taking his own life by swallowing cyanide (in which case he would receive a hero's funeral and his family would be spared imprisonment).  Rommel opted for suicide on 14 October 1944; details of his fate were confirmed by his widow and son after the end of the war.

As a substitute for honor killings 
A forced suicide may be a substitute for an honor killing when a woman violates the namus in conservative Middle Eastern societies. In 2006, the United Nations investigated reports of forced suicides of women in southeastern Turkey.

References 

 

Execution methods